Lea Del Bo Rossi (1903–1978), also known as Lea Rossi Del Bo, was an Italian medical researcher who studied clinical microscopy and neurohistopathology.

Life and work 
Lea Del Bo was born 4 March 1903 in Cassano Magnago, Italy, to Adele Mazzucchelli and the doctor Luigi Del Bo. After high school, she enrolled at the Faculty of Medicine at the University of Pavia and studied clinical microscopy and neurohistopathology with Camillo Golgi (1843–1926), Luigi Sala (1863–1930), Edoardo Perroncito (1847–1936) and Scipione Riva-Rocci (1863–1937). She graduated with honors in 1925. 

To continue her thesis research on multiple sclerosis after graduation, she began attending the neurohistopathological laboratory of the Mondino Foundation, directed at that time by the psychiatrist Ottorino Rossi (1877–1936), of whom she would become a pupil and life partner. At some point, Lea added "Rossi" to her own name but in an inconsistent way, sometimes before her maiden name and sometimes after. In Del Bo's obituary, neurologist Giuseppe Carlo Riquier referred to Ottorino Rossi as "her husband."

She conducted clinical research as a doctor at the Provincial Psychiatric Institute of Milan, and published papers on psychiatric therapy, spinal cord automatism, cerebral echinococcosis, treatment of progressive paralysis with penicillin, regeneration nervosa and psychasthenia. There she worked with the institute's director Max Beluffi.

Beginning in the late 1940s, she explored "a staining method based on a Coz-silver impregnation technique, of which she presents the data in various articles in the Experimental journal of freniatria and The brain." She published her results in, The nervous system studied with a new technique, published in two parts in 1949 and 1950, and included many photomicrographs in her publications. In a review of Del Bo's work by Carlo Berlucchi, he said her technique was "capable of revealing figures not yet taken into evidence of nerve cells and fibers." 

Del Bo Rossi's research on tumors revealed their "rich innervation," and she formulated a hypothesis on the infectious origin of cancer. Some of her results were met with conflicting opinions but Lea vehemently held her ground. One of her patrons, Beluffi, said in his obituary for Del Bo Rossi that she responded, "with the caustic and pugnacious spirit that characterized her, never shied away" from the "lively interpretative polemics" that accompanied her writings.

Del Bo Rossi published a collection of her most significant research in 1974, just a few years before she died, hoping to publicize her contributions and finally obtain the visibility and public recognition that she felt had escaped her. Her collection, The nervous system studied with a new technique, Consents and evaluations, included comments from some of her followers, both domestic and international.

Selected works 
She published many (but not all) of her research using the last name "Rossi Del Bo" and sometimes did not capitalize the first letter in "Del."
 Rossi Del Bo, Lea. Tumors are innervated, "Experimental journal of phreniatria", 1948
 Rossi Del Bo, Lea. Study of a fibroplastic meningioma, "Experimental journal of phreniatria", 1948
 Rossi Del Bo, Lea. The nervous system studied with a new technique, Milan, Tip. A. Lucini and C., 1949
 Rossi Del Bo, Lea. The nervous system studied with a new technique, fasc. II, Milan, Tip. A. Lucini and C., 1950
 Rossi Del Bo, Lea. Letter to cancerologists, Milan, Tip. A. Lucini and C., 1950
 Rossi Del Bo, Lea. Communication to scholars of the “cancer problem”, Milan, Tip. A. Lucini and C., 1950
 del Bo Rossi, Lea. "Autorreferat über das Buch" Il sistema nervoso studiato con una nuova tecnica. Acta Neurovegetativa 1.1 (1950): 106-113.
 Rossi Del Bo, Lea. Mikroskopie, Wien, Band 6 / Heft 7/8, 1951
 Del, Bo R. L. "La Coscienza Della Forma." (1955). Print.
 Rossi Del Bo, Lea. Indication of dehydrocolic acid in high doses as a therapeutic agent for malignant tumors, Bulletin of the Italian society of experimental biology, Vol. XXXIX, fasc. 14, 1963
 Rossi Del Bo, Lea. The nervous system studied with a new technique. Consents and evaluations, Milan, 1974.

References

External links 
 C. Berlucchi, Review of The nervous system studied with a new technique, Experimental journal of freniatria, 1950, pp. 312-313

   

1903 births
1978 deaths
20th-century Italian women
20th-century women scientists
University of Pavia alumni